The European Short Course Swimming Championships 2006 were held in the Finnish capital, Helsinki, from Thursday 7 to Sunday 10 December. The venue of the event was the aquatic center of Mäkelänrinteen uintikeskus, which last hosted a major event at the pre-Olympic 2000 European Aquatics Championships.

Three world records (two in relays) and eight European records were broken during the event.

Medal table

Medal summary

Men's events

Women's events

Results
Record information was correct before the Championships started.

Men's events

50 m freestyle

100 m freestyle

200 m freestyle

400 m freestyle

1500 m freestyle

50 m backstroke

100 m backstroke

200 m backstroke

50 m breaststroke

100 m breaststroke

200 m breaststroke

50 m butterfly

100 m butterfly

200 m butterfly

100 m individual medley

200 m individual medley

400 m individual medley

4 × 50 m freestyle relay

4 × 50 m medley relay

Women's results

50 m freestyle

100 m freestyle

200 m freestyle

400 m freestyle

800 m freestyle

50 m backstroke

100 m backstroke

200 m backstroke

50 m breaststroke

100 m breaststroke

200 m breaststroke

50 m butterfly

100 m butterfly

200 m butterfly

100 m individual medley

200 m individual medley

400 m individual medley

4 × 50 m freestyle relay

4 × 50 m medley relay

References

 Swim Rankings Results

External links
 Homepage European SC Championships 2006
 Results book

2006 in swimming
S
2006
Swimming
International sports competitions in Helsinki
Swimming competitions in Finland
December 2006 sports events in Europe
2000s in Helsinki